The 1936–37 Svenska mästerskapet was the sixth season of Svenska mästerskapet, a tournament held to determine the Swedish Champions of men's handball. Teams qualified by winning their respective District Championships. 17 teams competed in the tournament. SoIK Hellas were the defending champions, and won their second title, defeating Redbergslids IK in the final. The final was played on 4 April in Alvikshallen in Stockholm, and was watched by 2,101 spectators.

Results

First round
Västerås IK–IFK Eskilstuna 18–8
KFUM Örebro–I 4 Linköping w/o
IF Göta–IF Elfsborg 10–15
Redbergslids IK–IFK Uddevalla 23–11

Second round
IF Gute–Upsala Studenters IF w/o
Gefle IF–SoIK Hellas 9–13
Västerås IK–KFUM Örebro 26–8
IF Elfsborg–Redbergslids IK 7–18
Flottans IF Karlskrona–Malmö BI 12–6
Halmstads BK–IF Hallby w.o.

Quarterfinals
Upsala Studenters IF–SoIK Hellas 8–9
Västerås IK–Redbergslids IK 9–22
Flottans IF Karlskrona–IF Hallby 26–8

Semifinals
Sollefteå GIF–SoIK Hellas w/o
Redbergslids IK–Flottans IF Karlskrona 15–5

Final
SoIK Hellas–Redbergslids IK 9–7

Champions 
The following players for SoIK Hellas received a winner's medal: Arne Karlsson, Sven Johansson, Sture Johansson, Bertil Särneman, Bo Bäckström, Arne Leckström, Åke Fröander, Jan Hellstadius and Mats Hellstadius.

See also
1936–37 Allsvenskan (men's handball)

References 

Swedish handball competitions